Jayne Njeri Wanjiku Kihara is a Kenyan politician. She is currently the member of parliament for Naivasha Constituency.

Education 
Jayne Njeri Wanjiru Kihara attended her primary at Riamukurue. She also joined secondary education at Githunguri Girls. She furthered her education at Cathedral Secretarial College.

Personal life 
She is the wife of the late member of parliament for Naivasha Constituency, Paul Kihara.

References

Living people
21st-century Kenyan women politicians
21st-century Kenyan politicians
Members of the National Assembly (Kenya)
Year of birth missing (living people)